Mutinhiri is a surname. Notable people with the surname include:

Ambrose Mutinhiri (born 1944), Zimbabwean politician
Tracy Mutinhiri, Zimbabwean politician
Vimbai Mutinhiri (born 1987), Zimbabwean actress, model, and television personality

Surnames of African origin